Malaysians Against Death Penalty & Torture (MADPET) is a movement for the abolition of the death penalty and torture.  MADPET has been involved in many other human rights causes including fighting for freedom of expression, right to privacy, right to a fair trial and against the abuse of power police and other law enforcement officials. MADPET is for the promotion of human rights, human freedoms and justice in Malaysia and around the world. The founding coordinators of MADPET are Charles Hector, N. Surendran and Salbiah Ahmad. Other persons involved in MADPET are Francis Pereira and Shan.

MADPET works much with other groups for the promotion of human rights and justice. MADPET also is a founding member of ADPAN (Anti-Death Penalty Asia Network)

Abolition of Death Penalty in Malaysia 

MADPET was instrumental in starting the campaign for the abolition of the death penalty, which led to the Malaysian Bar  resolution in 2006 and the Bar remains committed to abolition, and today is a call that has been adopted by SUHAKAM (Malaysian National Human Rights Commission), civil society groups,  trade unions and others.  

PM and cabinet must have courage to totally abolish death penalty-Malaysiakini, 15/3/2019  

MADPET: Enact and enforce laws repealing mandatory death penalty before Malaysian Parliament is dissolved - TOC, 9/10/2022  

NGO lauds govt for adopting anti-death penalty resolution at UN assembly-Malaysiakini, 19/12/2022  

Malaysia voted in UN to abolish the death penalty; walk the talk now – Madpet - ALIRAN, 20/12/2022

Death in Custody

MADPET has been actively campaigning alone, and with others towards the end of death in especially police

Abolition of Detention Without Trial and Draconian Laws

MADPET in the media  

Madpet: Single mum's death sentence shows drug law harsh on the poor - Malaysiakini, 20/10/2021  

Abolish death penalty, suspend pending executions, say groups, MP -  FMT, 10/10/2021 

Human rights groups call for inquests into recent police custodial deaths - Malay Mail, 7/6/2021 

Independent coroners and inquests needed for all deaths in custody - ALIRAN, 18/6/2021  

Inquests for deaths caused by police shootings: Madpet - Malaysiakini, 18/9/2019  

Hukuman mati: MP pembangkang, senator usah sabotaj pula - Berita Harian, 11/10/2018 

Madpet shocked at execution on verge of abolition of mandatory death penalty - Malaysiakini, 24/9/2016 

We voted for a moratorium on the death penalty - Star, 23/12/2020  

Human Rights Groups Denounce Malaysia for Hanging Murderers -  The News Lens, 29/3/2016

Making a change - 29/11/2015

See also
 List of most recent executions by jurisdiction

References

MADPET calls on Singapore to stop its plans to execute Malaysian citizen in respect of Malaysian court,  The Online Citizen, 11/7/2017

External links
 MADPET Blog
 ADPAN - Anti-Death Penalty Asia Network

Human rights organisations based in Malaysia